Gary John Jarman is a British multi-instrumentalist, best known for being bassist and singer in the Wakefield music group The Cribs. Formed in 2002, The Cribs have released eight albums to date, and numerous singles and EPs.  their latest three records have charted in the UK top 10, alongside 7 top 40 singles. He has lived in Portland, Oregon, since 2006.

The band consists of his twin brother Ryan and his younger brother Ross. Gary is the most political member of The Cribs, and can regularly be heard in interviews criticizing inequality and misogyny in the music industry. This could be attributed to the fact that he spent a few years prior to the band's success, participating as part of the committee that put on the UK's first "Ladyfest" in London, and also numerous fundraisers around this time.

In 2009 he underwent surgery in the US to remove growths from his vocal cords.

Other work
He has been seen with various other bands, such as Quasi (in which his wife Joanna Bolme plays bass), Comet Gain, and Jeffrey Lewis – guesting as a drummer all times. In 2008, he recorded vocals for a track called "I Would Like to be Forgiven" by fellow Wakefield band The Research, and appeared in the music video for Stephen Malkmus and The Jicks' song "Gardenia".

In 2009, on very short notice, he played bass with Franz Ferdinand during two of their shows supporting Green Day when bassist Bob Hardy forgot about a wedding he had been invited to. Later that year he guested on Guided By Voices frontman Robert Pollard's new band Boston Spaceships album, The Planets Are Blasted.

In 2010, he contributed his bass playing as part of ex-Grandaddy guitarist Jim Fairchild's new project All Smiles, appearing on the album Staylow and Mighty.

In 2016, he engineered and produced the debut album by Portland instrumental-prog trio Blesst Chest, in his basement.

Bass
In 2014, Jarman was named one of the "Greatest Bass Players of All-Time" by NME and its readers. His playing style was described thus "A true punk, Jarman’s bass playing is often violent and thrashy but he never misses a note or a beat."

In 2016, it was announced that Jarman would receive his own signature bass through Fender/Squier. The Gary Jarman Signature Bass was released in August 2016.

He endorses Fender basses, of which he prefers the Precision and Mustang, and Ampeg bass amplifiers, using valve Classics and Vintage, as well as the solid-state SVT 350, through classic 8x10 cabinets.

References

Living people
British identical twins
English male singers
English rock bass guitarists
Male bass guitarists
Musicians from Wakefield
English twins
Twin musicians
The Cribs members
1980 births